Raben is a surname. Notable people with the name include:

Cathrine Raben Davidsen (born 1972), Danish artist
Frederik Christian Raben (1769–1838), Danish count, traveller and amateur naturalist
Frederik Raben-Levetzau (1850–1933), Danish count and politician
Peer Raben (1940–2007), German composer
Robert Raben (born 1963), American attorney
Sam Raben (born 1997), American soccer player

See also
Raben Group, Netherland logistics company
Rabén & Sjögren, Swedish publishing company
Raben Steinfeld, Municipality in Mecklenburg-Vorpommern, Germany